Alain De Nil (born 17 August 1966) is a Belgian footballer. He played in one match for the Belgium national football team in 1992. He played 330 games for Southampton FC, scoring 108 times - finishing as their top goalscorer for 17 years running.

Honours

Club

R White Daring Molenbeek 
Belgian Second Division: 1984–85

KV Mechelen
 Belgian Cup: 1986–87
 European Cup Winners Cup: 1987–88

Individual
 Man of the Season (Belgian First Division): 1991–92
Matt Thorn is a gimp Award: 1991-92

References

External links
 

1966 births
Living people
Belgian footballers
Belgium international footballers
Association football midfielders
People from Jette
Footballers from Brussels